The Cine Doré is a cinema in Madrid, Spain. It is currently used for Filmoteca Española screenings.

History 
Envisioned as a "socio-cultural hall", the original venue was commissioned by Mariano Tejero Ruiz in 1912. Years later, in 1922, it was rebuilt as a cinema hall by architect . It fell into disuse in the 1960s.

In 1989, after a 26 year closure, the Cine Doré re-opened as the venue for Filmoteca Española screenings.

References 

Cinemas in Madrid
Buildings and structures in Embajadores neighborhood, Madrid
Art Nouveau architecture in Spain